Tarover is a historic home located near South Boston, Halifax County, Virginia. It was built in 1856, and is a two-story, gable roofed stone dwelling set on a low stone foundation in the Gothic Revival style.  It is three bays wide and features a two-story projecting porch tower with a gable roof.

It was listed on the National Register of Historic Places in 1978.

References

Houses on the National Register of Historic Places in Virginia
Gothic Revival architecture in Virginia
Houses completed in 1856
Houses in Halifax County, Virginia
National Register of Historic Places in Halifax County, Virginia